Petkevičius is a Lithuanian male surname. Its feminine forms  are: Petkevičienė (married woman or widow) and Petkevičiūtė (unmarried woman).

Notable persons with that name include:

Juozas Petkevičius (born 1948), Lithuanian basketball coach, masseur, and former rugby player
Jurgis Petkūnas or Petkevičius (died in 1574), Bishop of Samogitia from 1567 to 1574
Kazys Petkevičius (1926–2008), Lithuanian basketball player
Merkelis Petkevičius (–1608), a Reformation (Calvinist) activist in the Grand Duchy of Lithuania

See also
 Petkevich (Belarusian)

Lithuanian-language surnames